Estadio Olímpico is a multi-use stadium in Concepción de la Vega, Dominican Republic.  It is currently used mostly for football matches and hosts the home games of Jarabacoa of the Liga Dominicana de Fútbol.  The stadium holds 7,000 spectators.

Renovations
The terrains was renovated after the 2015 Liga Dominicana de Fútbol, and now is up to the requirements of the CONCACAF.

External links
Stadium information

Olimpico
Buildings and structures in La Vega Province
La Vega, Dominican Republic